Sarah Shannon is a female vocalist best known for her work in the band Velocity Girl. Shannon released two solo albums: Sarah Shannon (2002, Casa Recording Co.) and City Morning Song (2007, Minty Fresh). She also joined Styrofoam to record the song "I Found Love." In addition, she fronted the short-lived band Starry Eyes, which put out a short EP and played one live show at the Black Cat club in Washington D.C. Other members of the band included former members of Velocity Girl and Shades Apart. She is currently a member of The Not-Its!, a children's music rock band. Shannon currently lives in Seattle, Washington.

External links 
 Sarah Shannon (official website)
 Copacetic Zine interview with Sarah Shannon 

American women rock singers
American indie rock musicians
Living people
Year of birth missing (living people)
21st-century American women